The Steel Wheels are an Americana Roots Folk Rock band based in the Blue Ridge Mountains of Virginia.

Biography
The Steel Wheel release albums under their own label, Big Ring Records. During the first few months of the pandemic and cessation of all touring, The Steel Wheels recorded over 120 songs in their isolated studios.  

Trent Wagler is lead vocalist, mountain banjo player, guitarist and the band's primary songwriter. Jay Lapp plays mandolin, guitar, electric guitar and sings. Eric Brubaker plays fiddle and sings. Kevin Joaquin Garcia plays drums, hand percussion and keyboards. Former member Brian Dickel plays Bass and sings. Brian has accepted ownership of Huss & Dalton Guitars and has since amicably left the band. Derek Kratzer will join The Steel Wheels on stage and in the studio starting September of 2021.

Red Wing Roots Music Festival 
Since 2012, the group has hosted the Red Wing Roots Music Festival at Natural Chimneys Park in Mt. Solon, Virginia.

Honors, awards, and distinctions
The Steel Wheels received six nominations from the Independent Music Awards in the 2010s. Their song "Nothing You Can't Lose" (from the album Red Wing) received the award of "Best Country Song" in the 10th Annual IMA Awards and in the Vox Pop Awards. "Working on a Building" won "Best Gospel Song" in the 10th Annual IMA Vox Pop Awards. Red Wing earned very high marks from critics and received airplay on radio stations across several markets. The album charted for 13 weeks on the Americana Music Association Top 40 radio charts, hitting No. 15. It also made its way onto the EuroAmericana charts, finding its way into the top 10. It was ranked number two across all independent releases charted by the Americana Music Association, and number 70 on the top 100 Americana albums of 2010.
Their "Rain in the Valley" was chosen as NPR's Song of the Day for May 10, 2012.
The group appeared opening day at the Stagecoach Festival 2013 in Indio, California.

Discography

Albums

Journal of a Barefoot Soldier Trent Wagler Released: June 6, 2005 Label: Dojo Records 
Blue Heaven Trent Wagler and The Steel Wheels Released: October 13, 2006 Label: Big Ring Records 
Adrienna Valentine Trent Wagler & Jay Lapp Released: March 13, 2008 Label: Dojo Records 
Red Wing The Steel Wheels Released: February 15, 2010 Label: Big Ring Records 
Uncloudy Day Trent Wagler & Jay Lapp Released: May 10, 2010 Label: Independent 
Lay Down, Lay Low Released: March 5, 2012 Label: Big Ring Records 
No More Rain Released: April 16, 2013 Label: Big Ring Records 
Leave Some Things Behind Released: April 14, 2015 Label: Big Ring Records 
Wild as We Came Here Released: May 5, 2017 Label: Big Ring Records 
Over the Trees Released: July 12, 2019 Label: Big Ring Records 
Everyone a Song Volume One Released: November 1, 2020 Label: Big Ring Records 
Everyone a Song Volume Two To Be Released: November 1, 2021: Big Ring Records

Live albums

 The Steel Wheels, Live at Goose Creek (Goose Creek Music, 2011)
 The Steel Wheels, Live at The Station Inn Volume I (Big Ring Records, 2018)
 The Steel Wheels, Live at The Jefferson Theater Volume II (Big Ring Records, 2018)

Singles
"The Coo Coo Bird b/w Architect's Daughter" + "With It All Stripped Away" Released: 2017 Label: Need To Know 
"Working on a Building" + "Red Rocking Chair" Released: 2018 Label: Big Ring Records 
"When to Say Goodnight" + "Underground" Released: 2020 Label: Big Ring Records

References

External links 

 
 Red Wing Roots Music Festival official site

American folk musical groups
Musical groups from Virginia
People from Harrisonburg, Virginia
Music festivals in Virginia